Kithakithalu is a 2006 Indian Telugu-language romantic comedy film starring Allari Naresh, Geetha Singh, Madhu Shalini and Jayalalitha. The film is made by Allari Naresh's home banner under the direction of his father E. V. V. Satyanarayana. It's based on the Tamil movie Chinna Veedu.

Plot
Relangi Rajababu is such a "nice guy" that he files a case against a girl who attempted to harass him, and did not succumb to her, because he wished to remain "pure" for the woman he marries. After landing a job as an SI, his parents force him to get married because his dowry will be useful for his sister's wedding. No girl wants to marry him now, because they wonder if he is man enough since he rejected a girl like her. He ends up marrying a rich, plump girl Soundarya after his parents and family threaten to commit suicide if he doesn't accept the proposal. Now this "nice guy" suddenly turns to other women and wants to divorce his fat wife. His attempts to make her grant him a divorce and whether he turns over a new leaf is the rest of the story.

Cast
 Allari Naresh as Relangi Rajababu
 Geetha Singh as Soundarya
 Madhu Shalini as Rambha
 Giri Babu as Rajababu's father
 Jaya Prakash Reddy as S. V. Ranga Rao, Soundarya's father
 M. S. Narayana as Nagarjuna/ Nag, Soundarya's grandfather
 Dharmavarapu Subramanyam as SP Balasubramanyam
 Lakshmipati as Nana Patekar / Aryan Rajesh, Car driver
 AVS as Chidatala Appa Rao, Soundarya's neighbour
 L. B. Sriram as Purohitudu Veturi Sitarama Sastry
 Krishna Bhagavan as Nagesh
 Brahmanandam as Broker
 Allari Subhashini as Bipasa Basu, AVS's wife
 Raghu Babu as a Lawyer
 Venu Madhav as a chain-snatching thief
 Ali as Room boy

External links
 Movie review

References
  
  https://web.archive.org/web/20061103193553/http://www.cinegoer.com/reviews/kitakitalu.htm

2006 films
2000s Telugu-language films
Films directed by E. V. V. Satyanarayana